Abuná can refer to:

 Abuna River, river between Bolivia and Brazil
 Abuná Province, Bolivia

See also
 Abuna, title of bishop in Ethiopian Orthodox Church